Stonehage Fleming was formed in 2014, when Fleming Family & Partners, the family office run by relatives of banking pioneer Robert Fleming and James Bond creator Ian Fleming, merged with Stonehage, an international family office with its roots in South Africa.

The company advises on more than £45billon of assets and employs over 500 people across 11 offices in eight countries.

Stonehage Fleming's headquarters are located in Jersey, other offices are located in London, Switzerland, Israel to Luxembourg, South Africa to the US and Canada.

History
Fleming traces its origins back to 1873 when Dundee-born financier Robert Fleming founded merchant bank Robert Fleming & Co. Robert Fleming had amassed a large personal fortune investing in the American railroads.

Stonehage was set up in 1976 as a “diaspora vehicle” by a group of South African families who were fleeing the country's apartheid regime. It operates as adviser, fiduciary and investment manager.

Fleming Family & Partners (FF&P) was established in 2000 by the Roddie Fleming and the Fleming family after the sale of Robert Fleming & Co to Chase Manhattan, which merged with JPMorgan.

Stonehage and FF&P merged to create a global multi-family office in 2014.

In 2018 Stonehage Fleming signed an agreement with US family office Glenmede Trust Company. Both firms remained independently managed and privately held.

On 21 December 2018, Caledonia Investments plc announced that it had agreed to acquire a minority stake in Stonehage Fleming & Family partners Limited.

Stonehage Fleming acquired the investment activities of Cavendish Asset Management and took over the running of its range of four OEIC funds in April 2020.

Purpose 
The main services are:

 Succession & Governance
 Family Office
 Expert Fiduciary
 Legal & Tax Advisory
 Family Business Advisory
 Wealth Planning
 Insurance Services
 Philanthropy
 Investment Management
 Private Equity
 Dealing & Treasury
 Export Reporting
 Corporate Finance
 Corporate Services
 Art Management
 Property Advisory

People

Chris Merry was appointed Group Chief Executive Officer for Stonehage Fleming in 2019 after taking over from Giuseppe Cuicci who led the business since 1997.

Giuseppe is managing partner and deputy chairman of the Stonehage Fleming Group Board. He joined the group in 1991 as a client manager and was appointed partner in 1995 before becoming chief executive two years later.

In 2014 Giuseppe negotiated the merger with Fleming Family & Partners to create Stonehage Fleming. In 2019 he also agreed a substantial minority investment by Caledonia Plc in the group after which he relinquished the role of CEO and became managing partner alongside Ari Tatos.

Ari is joint managing partner of Stonehage Fleming and joined the group in 1986 after qualifying as a Chartered Accountant with Arthur Andersen.

Mark McMullen is a partner and the group deputy chief executive officer. He serves as a key adviser to a number of high-net-worth international families.  Mark joined the Stonehage Fleming Group in 2001 in Neuchatel, Switzerland. In 2009 he relocated to Geneva to establish and head up the Geneva office. From Geneva, Mark also oversees Stonehage Fleming's Family Office businesses in Switzerland, Jersey, Israel, Luxembourg, South Africa, the UK, the US and Canada.

Adrian Gardner is the group chief operating officer; he joined the group in 2019.

Ian Crosby is head of group risk and chairman of Stonehage Fleming Jersey. He became a partner of the group in 1995.

Simon Boadle is head of UK Family Office and Advisory.  He leads the advisory businesses in the UK, which include Family Office, Wealth Planning, Corporate Finance, Art Advisory and Stonehage Fleming Law.  He joined Stonehage Fleming in 2017 as chairman of corporate finance.

Bob Reid is a partner and head of group enablement. He also serves as the relationship manager for a number of high-net-worth international families.  Bob joined the group in 2010.

Graham Wainer is CEO and head of investments at Stonehage Fleming Investment Management in the UK. He is also chairman of the CIO Group.

Johan van Zyl is the chairman of Stonehage Fleming South Africa and a member of the group executive committee.  He joined the group in 2010 to start the Investment Management Division in South Africa and was appointed as CEO of Stonehage Fleming South Africa in 2013.

Stonehage Fleming recruited former Deloitte global chairman John Connolly to chair its board in October 2019. He replaced Charles Erasmus, who stepped down after 20 years in the role.  

Duncan Johnson is a member of the board and head of Caledonia Private Capital.  He has led the Private Capital team since joining Caledonia in 2011.  Duncan is also a non-executive director of Seven Investment Management and Buzz Bingo. He is also an independent non-executive director of Northern Trust (Guernsey) Limited.

Duncan Johnson joined as a member of the board in 2019. He is currently head of Caledonia Private Capital since joining in 2011. Duncan is also an independent non-executive director of Northern Trust (Guernsey) Limited.

Tim Lewis joined as a member of the board in 2021.   He joined Caledonia Investments in 2011 and works within the Private Capital team. Tim also sits on the board of Cooke Optics.

Shelby du Pasquier has served as a member of the board at Stonehage Fleming since 2012.

Robert Kirkby joined as member of the board on 1 October 2020.

Gian Rossi joined as member of the board in May 2020.

Stonehage Fleming founded its UK advisory board with Lord (Robin) Renwick as its chairman in November 2020, alongside Natalie Campbell and Anthony Wreford who also joined the board.

Lord Renwick was a senior diplomat who served as British ambassador to the US and South Africa. He was a crossbench peer in the House of Lords until 2018, and sat on many boards, including Richemont AG, SAB Miller plc, British Airways plc. He is a former member of the Stonehage Fleming Group Board.

Campbell is a social entrepreneur who founded A Very Good Company in 2011. She is currently CEO of Belu Water and a board member for the London Economic Action Partnership and the Old Oak and Park Royal Development Corporation (OPDC).

Wreford, formerly deputy chairman of Omnicom Europe and president of the MCC.  He holds a variety of non-executive appointments, including FPE Capital and Portas Consulting.

References

External links
 Official website

1873 establishments
Fleming family
Investment management companies of the United Kingdom